USS Kermanshah (ID-1473) was a cargo ship that served in the United States Navy from 1918 to 1919.

Kermanshah was built as the commercial cargo ship SS Himalaia in 1910 at Newcastle upon Tyne, England, by the Northumberland Shipbuilding Company for an Austro-Hungarian shipping firm. In August 1914, when the outbreak of World War I made the seas unsafe for Central Powers' shipping, Himalaia took refuge at New York City in the neutral United States and was laid up there. When the United States entered the war on the side of the Allies in April 1917, the United States Government seized Central Powers ships in American ports, Himalaia among them. The Kerr Navigation Company of New York City bought Himalaia, renamed her SS Kermanshah, after the Iranian city of Kermanshah, and placed her in commercial service under the American flag.

The U.S. Navy acquired Kermanshah from Kerr Navigation for World War I service on 1 August 1918, assigned her the naval registry Identification Number (Id. No.) 1473, and commissioned her on 3 August 1918 at New York City as USS Kermanshah.

Kermanshah departed New York on 17 August 1918 in convoy for Bordeaux, France, with a cargo of general United States Army supplies. Arriving at Bordeaux on 3 September 1918, she returned to New York City on 24 September 1918. Departing New York once again on 12 October 1918, she made a second round-trip voyage to Bordeaux, returning to New York in November 1918. In December 1918, she departed New York on a voyage to Quiberon and Nantes, France, completing this voyage by returning to New York on 13 February 1919 from Nantes with a cargo of munitions.

Kermanshah was decommissioned on 5 March 1919 and transferred to the United States Shipping Board the same day for return to the Kerr Navigation Company.

The ship reentered commercial service as SS Kermanshah. She was renamed SS Oceana in 1922, SS Nymphe in 1927, and SS Kalliopi in 1928. During World War II, Kalliopi was torpedoed and sunk by the German submarine U-402 in the North Atlantic Ocean on 7 February 1943.

Notes

References

Department of the Navy: Naval Historical Center Online Library of Selected Images:  Civilian Ships: S.S. Kermanshah (American Freighter, 1910) Originally Austro-Hungarian S.S. Himalaia. Served as USS Kermanshah (ID # 1473) in 1918-1919. Later S.S. Oceana, Nymphe, and Kalliopi. 
NavSource Online: Section Patrol Craft Photo Archive: Kermanshah (ID 1473)

World War I cargo ships of the United States
Ships sunk by German submarines in World War II
Shipwrecks in the Atlantic Ocean
Ships built on the River Tyne
1909 ships
Cargo ships of the United States Navy
Maritime incidents in February 1943